Life is an album by Canadian musician Neil Young and his American backing band Crazy Horse, and it is Young's last release on the Geffen label. As with their 1979 album Rust Never Sleeps, Young and the Horse performed most of this album's songs live with the exceptions of "Cryin' Eyes" and "We Never Danced" which were recorded in studio. The album was released on July 6, 1987.

The first three tracks all handle the topic of world politics, and ponder the role of the United States in the world. "Long Walk Home," for example, empathizes with troops under deployment overseas. Though in response to the foreign policy issues of the time (Beirut, Qaddafi), Young found new meaning in these songs in the context of the war on terror and the occupation of Iraq. During his "Freedom of Speech" tour in support of Living with War, Young posted videos of these three songs on his website. The "Mideast Vacation" and "Long Walk Home" videos were later released on the DVD included with the album Living with War: In the Beginning. The performances are from his 1986 tour with Crazy Horse and are labeled as being "From Neil Young Archives Volume 3," a perennially unreleased box set in a series of such collections eventually promised to chronicle Young's entire career.

The live tracks were recorded in concert at the Universal Amphitheatre in Universal City, CA on November 18 and 19, 1986. "Mideast Vacation", "Around The World" and "When Your Lonely Heart Breaks" were recorded on the 18th, "Inca Queen", "Too Lonely" and "Prisoners Of Rock 'N' Roll" were recorded on the 19th. "Long Walk Home" is a mix of recordings from both these dates. The two studio recordings came from sessions at the Record One recording studio.

The song "We Never Danced" had made its first appearance on the soundtrack to the 1987 film Made in Heaven, in a version sung by Martha Davis of the Motels. Young had a cameo in the film as a truck driver.

The song "Long Walk Home" was originally written as "Letter from 'Nam" in the early 1970s, albeit with different lyrics. The track was officially released in 2020 on the Archives Volume II.

Track listing

Personnel

Track numbering refers to CD and digital releases of the album.

Neil Young – vocals, guitar, harmonica, keyboards, production
Crazy Horse
Poncho Sampedro – guitar, keyboards, backing vocals
Billy Talbot – bass, keyboards, backing vocals
Ralph Molina – drums, backing vocals
Additional
Jack Nitzsche – entire backing track (9)
Technical
David Briggs – production (1-8)
Jack Nitzsche – production (9)
Bryan Bell – programming, synth-bank
Michael Hoenig – programming (9)
Niko Bolas – recording (1–6, 8, 9), mixing (1–4, 9)
Coke Johnson – recording (7), mixing (5–8)
Tim Mulligan – engineering
Richard Landers – engineering
Brian Soucy – engineering
Chris Bellman – mastering

References

Neil Young live albums
1987 live albums
Albums produced by David Briggs (producer)
Albums produced by Jack Nitzsche
Geffen Records live albums
Crazy Horse (band) albums
Neil Young albums
1987 albums
Geffen Records albums